Psilodraco is a monotypic genus of marine ray-finned fish belonging to the family Bathydraconidae, the Antarctic dragonfishes, its only species is Psilodraco breviceps. These fishes are native to the Southern Ocean.

Taxonomy
Psilodraco was first described as a genus in 1937 by the British ichthyologist John Roxborough Norman when he was describing the only species in this monotypic genus Psilodraco breviceps, the type of which had been collected by the Discovery Expedition off South Georgia. The genus name compounds psilos which means "naked", a reference Norman did not explain but this species lacks any obvious scales, and draco meaning "dragon", a common suffix used in name notothenioids, while the specific name breviceps means "short head", this species having a shorter snout than Gymnodraco acuticeps.

Description
Psilodraco has a naked, compressed body, the only scales being the imperforated scales that make up the five lateral lines. There is a strong ridge on the operculum which ends in a short, flattened spine and a flattened, hooked process. The snout is short, slightly concave and pointed. The mouth has a band of canine like teeth, made up of multiple series, the outermost series are enlarged with the most enlarged behind the symphysis on the upper jaw. There are 28-30 soft rays in the dorsal fin and 27-29 in the anal fin. In alcohol this fish is brown, covered in darker spots, paler on the underside and on the fins.

Distribution and habitat
Psilodraco is found in the Southern Ocean where it is endemism to the insular shelf of South Georgia.

Biology
Psilodraco spawns in the late autumn and early winter and the eggs probably hatch during the winter. A sampled female had ovaries which contained 1,340 eggs It is a synchronous spawner.

References

Bathydraconidae
Monotypic fish genera
Fish of the Atlantic Ocean
Fish described in 1937
Taxa named by John Roxborough Norman